The 2001 POMIS Cup was the 15th POMIS cup, an  international soccer club tournament held in Maldives. The group stage started on 26 October 2001, and the final was played on 6 November 2001 at the Rasmee Dhandu Stadium, Malé, Maldives.

Teams
Below are the top four teams of the 2001 Dhivehi League and two invited foreign clubs.

Teams and Nation
Note: Table lists clubs in alphabetical order.

Group stage

Group A

Group B

Semi finals

Final

References

 RSSSF 2001 POMIS Cup

2001
2001 in Asian football
2001 in Maldivian football
2001–02 in Indian football
2001 in Thai football